Durbin is an unincorporated community in Cass County, in the U.S. state of North Dakota.

History
Durbin was founded in 1881, and given the name of a railroad worker.  A post office was established at Durbin in 1881, and remained in operation until 1985.

References

Unincorporated communities in Cass County, North Dakota
Unincorporated communities in North Dakota